Someone I Loved is a 2009 French drama film directed by Zabou Breitman.

Cast 
 Daniel Auteuil - Pierre
 Marie-Josée Croze - Mathilde
 Florence Loiret Caille - Chloé
  - Suzanne Houdard
 Geneviève Mnich - Geneviève, la secrétaire

References

External links 

2009 drama films
2009 films
French drama films
2000s French films